Prescient Therapeutics Ltd is a clinical stage oncology company. The company is focused on the development of a universal CAR-T platform (OmniCAR), enhanced CAR-T cell manufacturing & function (CellPryme) and on two small molecule drug targeted therapies (PTX-100 & PTX-200).

History 

Prescient Therapeutics Ltd (Prescient) was created in 2014 by bringing together two small molecule drug assets from separate US private companies (Pathway Oncology for PTX-100 and AKTivate Therapeutics for PTX-200) into the existing ASX-listed company Virax Holdings Ltd (Virax).

Virax had been previously unsuccessful in developing a viral delivery of immunologic genes for the treatment of HIV. Paul Hopper, an Australian bio-entrepreneur, looking to access public markets to help develop the PTX-100 & PTX-200 assets, helped coordinate sequential reverse takeovers wherein Virax first acquired Pathway Oncology (deal announced 17 March 2014, completed 30 May 2014) and then AKTivate Therapeutics (deal announced 17 October 2014, completed 11 December 2014). Virax then changed its name to Prescient Therapeutics in December 2014.

Prescient expanded its focus into cellular therapies in 2019, and in May 2020 announced the development of its universal immune receptor platform OmniCAR from technologies developed at University of Pennsylvania (Penn) and Oxford University.

OmniCAR 

OmniCAR is a universal immune receptor platform enabling controllable T-cell activity and multi-antigen targeting with a single cell product. It is the first universal immune receptor allowing post-translational covalent loading of binders to T-cells.

Prescient developed the OmniCAR platform by combining a universal immune receptor technology invented at University of Pennsylvania (Penn) by Dr. Daniel J. Powell, Jr. and Dr. Andrew Tsourkas, with a molecular binding system (termed SpyTag/SpyCatcher) licensed from the University of Oxford, together with other Prescient proprietary technologies.

The resultant modular CAR system, named OmniCAR, decouples antigen recognition from the T-cell signalling domain. The targeting ligand can then be administered and titrated separately to the CAR-T cells thereby creating on-demand and controllable T-cell activity post infusion. This separation of the ligand dosing provides potential safety advantages through increased control of the resultant CAR activation throughout the therapy, as well as ability to target multiple antigens, either simultaneously or sequentially, whilst allowing continual re-arming to generate, regulate and diversify a sustained T-cell response over time. Prescient notes this may assist in overcoming T-cell exhaustion and persistence, and these features collectively provide potential advantages in solid tumours which are characterised by antigen heterogeneity, antigen escape and a hostile tumour microenvironment.

Prescient’s initial focus for OmniCAR is CAR-T for oncology. However, the OmniCAR platform can be applied to any immune cell type (including T-cells, NK cells, Macrophages) and combine with any target binding ligand (scFv, Antibody, Aptamers, Labels for imaging) enabling a potential modular approach applicable to the broader field of cell therapies. OmniCAR is relevant for both autologous or allogeneic approaches.

OmniCAR Internal Programs 
In January 2021 Prescient named three internal clinical programs it would pursue using the OmniCAR platform:

 Acute Myeloid Leukemia (AML) targeting CD33 and CLL-1;

 Basket study of solid tumours including breast, ovarian and gastric cancers targeting Her2 for Her2+ tumours; and
 Glioblastoma Multiforme (GBM) targeting Her2 and EGFRviii

The programs are all currently in preclinical development.

In September 2022 Prescient entered a strategic collaboration with the MD Anderson Cancer Center (MD Anderson) to create OmniCAR T cells armed with an undisclosed novel binder with the aim of creating best-in-class cellular immunotherapies for blood cancers. Prescient described the binders as "T cell receptor (TCR)-like antibodies" which are expected to be both highly specific and will enable the targeting of proteins on the inside of a tumour cell. The initial focus of the collaboration is in AML, combining the novel binder from MD Anderson with Prescient’s existing CD33 & CLL-1 binders.

OmniCAR Preclinical Milestones 
Prescient has entered a collaboration agreement with Peter MacCallum Cancer Centre (Peter Mac), one of the world leaders in CAR-T research and manufacturing, to develop the OmniCAR technology. 

Since announcing the OmniCAR platform in May 2020 Prescient has released results of several preclinical milestones;

 Immunogenic profile: In-silico tests confirmed non-immunogenic profile of OmniCAR’s key components (SpyTag/ SpyCatcher), demonstrating a lower immunogenicity than approved humanised antibodies and comparable with human antibodies.
 Dose response: OmniCAR exhibited dose-dependent tumour killing activity, with the ability to control OmniCAR-T cell activity commensurate with amount of binder administered.
 Re-arming: OmniCAR-T cells could be pre-armed, washed, rested and then re-armed to exhibit the same levels and kinetics of cytotoxicity as pre-armed OmniCAR-T cells.
 Sequential arming and re-direction: OmniCAR was tested sequentially against a co-culture of GBM cells expressing antigens Her2 or EGFRviii where it was demonstrated OmniCAR cells can be redirected to a different antigen target with high target cytotoxicity immediately upon the administration of a different SpyTagged binder without needing new cells.

In August 2022 Prescient announced a manufacturing services agreement with Q-Gen Cell Therapeutics who will produce its OmniCAR cell lines for Prescient’s in-house clinical trials.

Cell Therapy Enhancements

CellPryme-M 
CellPryme-M, developed by Prescient in partnership with Peter Mac, was announced in June 2022 as a cell therapy enhancement platform technology that produces superior cells during the cell manufacturing process. During a single, rapid step during manufacturing, cells are pushed toward phenotypes with favourable characteristics for CAR-T including more central memory T-cells, more CD4+ helper cells, cells with more chemokine receptors and greater genomic stability. In pre-clinical trials Prescient demonstrated cells produced by CellPryme-M are less prone to exhaustion, enabling longer duration of cancer killing activity, and are capable of improved tumour trafficking and penetrance compared to the current generation of CAR-T cells. Resultantly, CellPryme-M CAR-T cells performed significantly better than conventional CAR-T cells in highly aggressive solid cancer models.

CellPryme-A 
CellPryme-A, developed by Prescient in partnership with Peter Mac, was announced in September 2022 as an adjuvant / neoadjuvant therapy designed to be administered intravenously to patients alongside cellular immunotherapy to help them overcome a suppressive tumour microenvironment. In preclinical studies using a solid tumour murine model (HER2+ MC38 colon carcinoma) CellPryme-A significantly decreased suppressive regulatory T cells; increased expansion of CAR-T cells in vivo; increased tumour penetration of CAR-T cells. CellPryme-A significantly improved both tumour killing and host survival and the effects were magnified when CellPryme-A was used in conjunction with CellPryme-M.

Prescient intends to use both its CellPryme-M and CellPryme-A technologies for its own OmniCAR programs in addition to offering it to other companies under licence to enhance their respective cell therapy products.

PTX-200 

PTX-200, Triciribine Phosphate Monohydrate, is a novel PH domain inhibitor that inhibits an important tumour survival pathway known as Akt, which plays a key role in the development of many cancers, including breast cancer and ovarian cancer, as well as leukaemia. PTX-200 was invented by Professor Said Sebti at the H. Lee Moffitt Cancer Center & Research Institute in Tampa, Florida.

PTX-200 is currently in a Phase 1b/2 trial in relapsed and refractory Acute Myeloid Leukemia (AML), where it has resulted in 4 complete remissions so far. The AML study is led by world-renowned leukemia expert Professor Jeffrey Lancet at the H. Lee Moffitt Cancer Center in Florida. PTX-200 has Orphan drug designation in AML from the FDA due to the current poor outcomes associated with the disease and relative lack of effective treatment options.

PTX-200 also previously generated encouraging Phase 2a data in HER2-negative breast cancer and Phase 1b in recurrent or persistent platinum resistant ovarian cancer.

PTX-100 

PTX-100 is a first in class compound with the ability to block an important cancer growth enzyme known as geranylgeranyl transferase-1(GGT-1). This enzyme, by posttranslationally modifying  the small GTPase Rho with isoprenoid lipids, plays a role in  malignant transformation of cells and the inhibition of apoptosis. PTX-100 disrupts oncogenic Ras pathways by inhibiting the activation of Rho, Rac and Ral circuits in cancer cells, leading to apoptosis (death) of cancer cells. PTX-100 is licensed by Prescient from Yale University, and was invented by Prescient Chief Scientific Officer, Professor Said Sebti, and Professor Andrew Hamilton.

PTX-100 demonstrated safety and early clinical activity in a previous Phase 1 study and recent PK/PD basket study of haematological and solid malignancies. PTX-100 is now in a Phase 1b expansion cohort study in T cell lymphomas, where it has shown encouraging efficacy signals and safety. The lead investigator on the study is Professor Miles Prince, AM.

PTX-100 was granted Orphan Drug Designation for the treatment of peripheral T-cell lymphomas (PTCL). Prescient has also obtained notice of allowance for a US patent covering the use of a companion diagnostic for stratifying patients most likely to respond to PTX-100 therapy.

References 

Biotechnology companies of Australia
Cancer organizations based in the United States
Companies listed on the Australian Securities Exchange
Science and technology in Melbourne